Chow Kai Wing (Traditional Chinese: 周佳榮; born 1947) is a Professor and the Head of Department of History in Hong Kong Baptist University.

Chow attended the Chinese University of Hong Kong, Hiroshima University, Osaka University of Foreign Studies and he gained a PhD at University of Hong Kong. Chow is a historian in Hong Kong and his research interests are focused on the modernization of East Asian Countries (China, Japan and Korea); Sino-Japanese relations; Intellectual History of Modern China.

Chow should not be confused with Chow Kai Wing of University of Illinois, who is also a historian.

Bibliography

References 

1947 births
Living people
Academic staff of Hong Kong Baptist University
Osaka University alumni
Hiroshima University alumni